Tuen Mun Rural is one of the 31 constituencies in the Tuen Mun District.

Created for the 1994 District Board elections, the constituency returns one district councillor to the Tuen Mun District Council, with an election every four years.

Tuen Mun Rural loosely covers areas surrounding 18 Rosewood, Bauhinia Garden, Chung Uk Tsuen, Lam Tei, Nai Wai, The Sherwood, Tuen Tsz Wai, Wo Ping San Tsuen and Yick Yuen Tsuen in rural area Tuen Mun with an estimated population of 20,491.

Councillors represented

Election results

2010s

References

Tuen Mun
Constituencies of Hong Kong
Constituencies of Tuen Mun District Council
1994 establishments in Hong Kong
Constituencies established in 1994